WRSE is a college radio station in Elmhurst, Illinois, a western suburb of Chicago.

Mission
WRSE strives to entertain and inform the Elmhurst University community, along with eastern and central DuPage County and western parts of Kane County, with student-run non-commercial music and talk programs.  Student members are afforded an opportunity to learn about and practice broadcasting, production, and management aspects of radio.

History
 1947 - WRS begins as a carrier current station organized by communication vets returning from World War II.
 1962 - WRSE-FM begins licensed broadcast operation at 88.7 MHz with 10 watts. (Dec. 7, 1962)
 1964 - Moved into new studios in College Union
 1986 - WRSE boosts power to 100 watts with a directional pattern.
 2002 - WRSE begins 24/7/365 operation with addition of computerized music automation system.
 2004 - WRSE begins live web stream.
 2008 - WRSE boosts power to 320 watts with a directional pattern.
2012 - WRSE opens its renovated Studio A.

References

External links
 Station website
 Station webstream

 Photo of:  WRSE tower & previous antenna at sunset

RSE
Elmhurst College
RSE
Radio stations established in 1962
1962 establishments in Illinois